James Cowell (born 28 July 1961) is a Scottish former footballer who played for Albion Rovers, Hearts, East Stirlingshire, Ayr United, Clyde, Falkirk, East Fife and Dumbarton.

References

1961 births
Scottish footballers
Dumbarton F.C. players
Albion Rovers F.C. players
East Stirlingshire F.C. players
Ayr United F.C. players
Heart of Midlothian F.C. players
East Fife F.C. players
Falkirk F.C. players
Clyde F.C. players
Scottish Football League players
Living people
Association football midfielders